Bodhi Day is the Buddhist holiday that commemorates the day that Gautama Buddha (Shakyamuni) is said to have attained enlightenment, also known as bodhi in Sanskrit and Pali.  According to tradition, Siddhartha had recently forsaken years of extreme ascetic practices and resolved to sit under a peepal tree, also known as a Bodhi tree (Ficus religiosa), and simply meditate until he found the root of suffering, and how to liberate oneself from it.

Shakyamuni's awakening
Traditions vary on what happened. Some say Siddhartha made a great vow to Nirvana and Earth to find the root of suffering, or die trying.  In other traditions, while meditating he was harassed and tempted by the god Mara (literally, "Destroyer" in Sanskrit), demon of illusion.  Other traditions simply state that he entered deeper and deeper states of meditation, confronting the nature of the self.

In the Pali Canon, there are several discourses said to be by Buddha himself, related to the story.  In The Longer Discourse to Saccaka (MN 36), the Buddha describes his Enlightenment in three stages:

 During the first watch of the night,  the Buddha discovered all of his past lives in the cycle of rebirth, realizing that he had been born and reborn countless times before.
 During the second watch, the Buddha discovered the Law of Karma, and the importance of living by the Eightfold Path.
 During the third watch, the Buddha discovered the Four Noble Truths, finally reaching Nirvana.

In his words:

All traditions agree that in the third watch of the night, Siddhartha finally found the answers he sought and became Enlightened, and experienced Nirvana.  Having done so, Siddhartha now became a Buddha or "Awakened One".

Festivals celebrating the Buddha's enlightenment
The enlightenment of the Buddha is yearly celebrated in many Buddhist countries.

Bodhi Day
Bodhi Day is observed in many mainstream Mahayana traditions including the traditional Zen and Pure Land schools of China, Korea, Japan, Vietnam and the Philippines. 

Services and traditions vary amongst Buddhist sects, but all such services commemorate the Buddha's achievement of Nirvana, and what this means for Buddhism today.  Individuals may choose to commemorate the event through additional meditation, study of the Dharma, chanting of Buddhist texts (sutras), or performing kind acts towards other beings. Some Buddhists celebrate with a traditional meal of tea, cake and readings.

Rōhatsu
In Japanese Zen, it is known as Rōhatsu or Rōhachi. In Japanese, the word literally means 8th day of the 12th month. It is typical for Zen monks and layperson followers to stay up the entire night before Rōhatsu practicing meditation, and the holiday is often preceded by an intensive sesshin. It is observed on the Gregorian date of December 8 as a result of the Westernization of Japan during the Meiji Restoration (1862–1869). In Tendai and other Japanese sects, it is called either  or simply .

Laba
The Chinese version of this festival is called Laba (臘八) which means the Eighth Day of the La (or the Twelfth) Month of the Chinese Lunar Calendar. It is most often observed in the first half of January, but it may happen on a date between the Winter Solstice (December 22) and the Chinese New Year (between January 22 and February 21).

Vesak Day
Bodhi Day is not as popularly celebrated as Vesak Day, on which the birth, enlightenment (Nirvāna), and passing away (Parinirvāna) of Gautama Buddha are celebrated.

See also
List of Buddhist festivals

References

Buddhist holidays
Buddhist festivals in Japan
December observances
Religious festivals in South Korea
Religious festivals in China
Buddhist festivals in Vietnam
Buddhist festivals in the Philippines